Tainui was a New Zealand parliamentary Māori electorate that existed between 2002 and 2008. It replaced the Hauraki electorate and absorbed a significant part of northern Te Tai Hauāuru. From the 2008 election it was replaced by the Hauraki-Waikato electorate.

The seat was held by Nanaia Mahuta of the Labour Party for the entirety of its existence from 2002 to 2008.

History

The Tainui electorate was replaced by the Hauraki-Waikato electorate in 2008.

Members of Parliament
Key

No candidates that contested the Tainui electorate were returned as list MPs.

Election results

2005 election

2002 election

References

External links
Electorate Profile  Parliamentary Library

Historical Māori electorates
2002 establishments in New Zealand
2008 disestablishments in New Zealand